USS Makassar Strait (CVE-91) was a  of the United States Navy. She was named after the Battle of Makassar Strait, an early naval engagement to the east of Borneo. Launched in March 1944, and commissioned in April, she served in support of the Battle of Okinawa. Postwar, she participated in Operation Magic Carpet. She was decommissioned in August 1946, when she was mothballed in the Pacific Reserve Fleet. Ultimately, she was used as a target, and she was accidentally ran aground on San Nicolas Island in April 1961. Her wreckage survived until at least 1965.

Design and description

Makassar Strait was a Casablanca-class escort carrier, the most numerous type of aircraft carrier ever built, and designed specifically to be mass-produced using prefabricated sections, in order to replace heavy early war losses. She displaced  standard,  with a full load. She was powered with two Skinner Unaflow reciprocating steam engines, which drove two shafts, providing , thus enabling her to make . Her compact size necessitated the installment of an aircraft catapult at her bow, and there were two aircraft elevators to facilitate movement of aircraft between the flight and hangar deck: one each fore and aft.

One /38 caliber dual-purpose gun was mounted on the stern. Anti-aircraft defense was provided by 8 Bofors  anti-aircraft guns in single mounts, as well as 12 Oerlikon  cannons, which were mounted around the perimeter of the deck. By the end of the war, Casablanca-class carriers had been modified to carry thirty 20–mm cannons, and the amount of 40–mm guns had been doubled to sixteen, by putting them into twin mounts. These modifications were in response to increasing casualties due to kamikaze attacks. Casablanca-class escort carriers were designed to carry 27 aircraft, but the hangar deck could accommodate more. For example, during the Battle of Okinawa, she carried 16 FM-2 fighters, and 12 TBM-3 torpedo bombers, for a total of 28  aircraft.

Construction
Her construction was awarded to Kaiser Shipbuilding Company, Vancouver, Washington under a Maritime Commission contract, on 18 June 1942, under the name Ulitaka Bay, as part of a tradition which named escort carriers after bays or sounds in Alaska. She was renamed Makassar Strait on 6 November 1943, as part of a new naval policy which named subsequent Casablanca-class carriers after naval or land engagements. The escort carrier was laid down on 29 December 1943, MC hull 1128, the thirty-sixth of a series of fifty Casablanca-class escort carriers. She was launched on 22 March 1944; sponsored by Mrs. Truman J. Hedding; transferred to the United States Navy and commissioned on 27 April 1944, with Captain Warren Kenneth Berner in command.

Service history

Upon being commissioned, Makassar Strait underwent a shakedown cruise down the West Coast to San Diego. On 6 June, she departed San Diego, transporting aircraft and passengers to the Marshall Islands, making a stop at Pearl Harbor along the way. On her return trip, she loaded military wounded, and ferried them back to the West Coast, arriving back at Southern California on 13 July. She spent the next two months as a training carrier, conducting pilot qualifications off Southern California. On 25 September, she left for another transport mission, ferrying 129 aircraft to Hawaii and the Admiralty Islands. She returned to Pearl Harbor on 26 October, with a load of damaged fighters, where she resumed training operations.

For the next three months, until the new year, she served yet again as a training carrier in the waters surrounding Hawaii, hosting a dozen different air groups on her deck. Captain Herbert D. Riley assumed command on January 10, 1945. About 6,700 landings were made on her flight deck, as she conducted various types of exercises. After loading her permanent aircraft contingent, Composite Squadron 97 (VC-97), she departed Pearl Harbor on 29 January 1945, and was assigned to Task Group 50.8 (Logistics Support Group). She stopped at Enewetak Atoll, before assuming her role protecting convoys supporting the frontline Fast Carrier Task Force. She also provided air screens for the transfer of replacement aircraft to their carriers.

She was assigned to a support carrier group on 8 April, and began conducting operations with the main strike group of Task Group 52.1. She consequently began combat operations over Okinawa in support of the ongoing battle. For the next four weeks, she provided close air support and bombed Japanese defenses as the marines struggled to fight their way south. During these operations, her fighters shot down four Japanese aircraft.

After retiring from Okinawa, she arrived at Guam on 11 May. She then operated as a training carrier in the vicinity of the Mariana Islands, providing refresher training for pilots. She finished her duties and left for Hawaii on 19 July, making a stop at Kwajalein Atoll, where she loaded fifty aircraft.  She arrived at Pearl Harbor on 29 July, where she took on 387 passengers. She then proceeded, on 14 August, to sail for the West Coast. She arrived at San Diego on 21 August, and served, yet again, as a training carrier off the Southern California coast until well past the Japanese surrender. By the end of October, there had been over 15,500 recorded landings on her flight deck.

On 4 November, she left San Diego, and joined the "Magic Carpet" fleet, which repatriated U.S. servicemen from throughout the Pacific. She sailed for Pearl Harbor, where she shipped troops to the Marshall Islands. She then stopped at Kwajalein, where she took on 1,092 veterans, and sailed back to the West Coast, arriving at San Diego on 29 November. On 4 December, she left for Guam, returning on 3 January 1946, repatriating a further 1,123 veterans back to the United States. She departed San Diego on 5 January, heading to Tacoma, Washington, making a stop at San Francisco. Upon arriving on 12 January, she was mothballed with the 19th Fleet, which would later become known as the Pacific Reserve Fleet.

She was declassified and decommissioned on 9 August 1946. She was reclassified as CVU-91 on 12 June 1955. On 28 August 1958, she was authorized to be used as a target and destroyed, and she was struck from the Navy list on 1 September 1958. During the next three years, she was used by the navy to gather data on the use of surface-launched missiles. During April 1961, while under tow to San Clemente Island off Southern California, she accidentally ran aground on San Nicholas Island in the Channel Islands. The Navy then sold her for breaking in situ on 2 May 1961. However, she was not scrapped, partially due to her less than optimal position. In 1965, it was known that she had not yet been broken up and was still being used as a target by the navy. Notably, by then, the entire escort carrier had since been split in half by the grounding.

References

Sources

Online sources

Bibliography

External links 

 
 U.S.S. Makassar Strait Regimental History (1946)

 

Casablanca-class escort carriers
World War II escort aircraft carriers of the United States
Ships built in Vancouver, Washington
1944 ships
Maritime incidents in 1961
Shipwrecks of the California coast
S4-S2-BB3 ships